The men's 100 metres event at the 1999 European Athletics U23 Championships was held in Göteborg, Sweden, at Ullevi on 29 and 30 July 1999.

Medalists

Results

Final
30 July
Wind: 2.8 m/s

Semifinals
29 July
Qualified: first 4 in each to the Final

Semifinal 1
Wind: 0.7 m/s

Semifinal 2
Wind: -0.3 m/s

Heats
29 July
Qualified: first 3 in each heat and 1 best to the Semifinal

Heat 1
Wind:-1.8 m/s

Heat 2
Wind: -0.3 m/s

Heat 3
Wind: 0.4 m/s

Heat 4
Wind: 1.6 m/s

Heat 5
Wind: 0.0 m/s

Participation
According to an unofficial count, 35 athletes from 19 countries participated in the event.

 (1)
 (1)
 (2)
 (3)
 (1)
 (1)
 (3)
 (2)
 (2)
 (1)
 (2)
 (1)
 (3)
 (3)
 (2)
 (1)
 (3)
 (2)
 (1)

References

100 metres
100 metres at the European Athletics U23 Championships